National Route 138 is a national highway of Japan connecting Fujiyoshida, Yamanashi and Odawara, Kanagawa in Japan, with a total length of 61.4 km (38.15 mi).

Route description

The highway connects Odawara in the western side of Kanagawa Prefecture to Fujiyoshida, a city on the northern side of Mount Fuji in Yamanashi Prefecture. From its eastern terminus at National Routes 1 and 255 in Odawara, the road travels west to the eastern limit of Fuji-Hakone-Izu National Park. The highway travels through the northern portion of the park, exiting it at its northwestern corner. Next the highway has a junction with the Tōmei Expressway in Gotemba. It then travels across the city and then enters the neighboring town, Oyama. In Oyama, the road has a junction with Higashifuji-goko Road. It then hugs the southern shore of Lake Yamanaka, the largest of the Fuji Five Lakes before crossing into Fujiyoshida where it meets its western terminus at an intersection with National Route 137.

List of major junctions

References

Former toll roads in Japan
138
Roads in Kanagawa Prefecture
Roads in Shizuoka Prefecture
Roads in Yamanashi Prefecture